Azhizhi is an English-language online newspaper published in Botswana. Established in 2020, it features articles in the fields of politics, foreign affairs, business and the economy, culture, law, technology, and science.  Azhizhi used to be a print newspaper before starting to publish online a few months after its founding.

The outlet changed from azhizhi.com to azhizhinews.com.

See also 
 Mmegi
 The Voice Botswana
 Botswana Guardian
 The Botswana Gazette
 Yarona FM

References

External links 
 

English-language newspapers published in Africa
Newspapers published in Gaborone
Tswana-language mass media
Online newspapers published in South Africa
Publications established in 2020
Newspapers established in 2020